Windsor School may refer to:

Windsor School, Chile
Windsor School, Germany
Windsor School, Winnipeg